Malcolm John Hazell,  (born 17 December 1948) is a retired Australian public servant. He was the Official Secretary to two Governors-General of Australia, Peter Hollingworth (2003) and Major General Michael Jeffery (2003–2008).

Early life
Hazell was born in Brisbane, Queensland, on 17 December 1948 to Neville John Hazell, a Second World War veteran, and his wife Joan Nell (née Ekelund), a former writer in the Women's Royal Australian Naval Service. Hazell was educated at the Anglican Church Grammar School and the University of Queensland, gaining a Bachelor of Arts degree with Honours.

Career
Malcolm Hazell had over 30 years experience in the Australian Public Service. He joined the Department of the Prime Minister and Cabinet (PM&C) in 1974, holding policy advising positions. He worked on parliamentary and government matters and international relations. As Head of the Office of Ceremonial and Hospitality, he supervised many arrangements, including the Australian Bicentenary celebrations in 1988, and he was the Commonwealth Director of Royal Visits to Australia. He was the Head of the Cabinet Secretariat from 1996 to 1998.

He was seconded to the position of Senior Government Adviser in the office of the Prime Minister John Howard. In 2003, he became Official Secretary to the Governor-General of Australia, Peter Hollingworth. That position also entails being Secretary of the Order of Australia. On Hollingworth's resignation later that year, he continued to serve his successor Major General Michael Jeffery.

In August 2008, there was considerable media comment when it was revealed that Jeffery's successor-designate, Quentin Bryce, had decided that she would appoint Stephen Brady as her Official Secretary when she took office on 5 September. This meant that Hazell's job would be ending and, although he made no public comment, he was reported to be "distraught" when informed of the matter three weeks earlier by the Secretary of the Department of the Prime Minister and Cabinet, Terry Moran. It was reported that Jeffery confronted Bryce about the matter when they met in Brisbane. However, Prime Minister Kevin Rudd stated that neither he nor his office played any part in Bryce's decision. At the same time, he defended Bryce's right to decide who her Official Secretary should be, and said that Hazell would be offered another position within the public service.

Honours
On 10 May 1988, Queen Elizabeth II invested Hazell as a Commander of the Royal Victorian Order for his services during the 1988 Royal Visit.

In 2008, Hazell was made a Knight of the Order of St John of Jerusalem.

On 8 June 2009, Hazell was appointed a Member of the Order of Australia "For service to the community and to successive Australian Governments through senior positions in the Australian Public Service, and as Official Secretary to the Governor-General of Australia." He received the insignia of the award from the current Governor-General, Ms Quentin Bryce, at an investiture at Government House, Canberra on 7 September 2009.

On 11 June 2010, Hazell was appointed an Extra Equerry to Her Majesty Queen Elizabeth II. He was advanced to Officer of the Order of Australia in the 2021 Australia Day Honours.

Personal
From 1994 to 2006 Hazell served on the board of Canberra Grammar School, as Chair of the Education Committee and also as deputy chairman of the board. He is also involved in community education activities with the Anglican Church.

He is married and has two sons.

References

Sources
 Edited transcript of a presentation to the ACT Branch of the Order of Australia Association, 23 March 2004

1948 births
Australian Commanders of the Royal Victorian Order
Australian public servants
Living people
Officers of the Order of Australia
People educated at Anglican Church Grammar School
People from Brisbane
University of Queensland alumni